Akaroa Harbour, is part of Banks Peninsula in the Canterbury region of New Zealand. The harbour enters from the southern coast of the peninsula, heading in a predominantly northerly direction. It is one of two major inlets in Banks Peninsula, on the coast of Canterbury, New Zealand; the other is Lyttelton Harbour on the northern coast.

The name Akaroa is an alternative spelling of Whakaroa, Whangaroa or Wangaloa from the Kāi Tahu dialect of Māori. Whakaroa means "Long Harbour".

The harbour was used commercially in the mid-19th century for ship-based and shore-based whaling. Cruise ships occasionally enter the harbour, with the passengers visiting Akaroa.

Ōnawe Peninsula is at the head of the harbour, the former site of a Māori pā.

Settlements 
Akaroa Harbour's waterfront has been continually inhabited since the 1840s.

Akaroa, Duvauchelle, Takapūneke, Takamatua, Barrys Bay, French Farm and Wainui lie on the shoreline of the harbour. They are connected to the rest of Canterbury via State Highway 75. French Bay, the site of the French settlement of Akaroa, was originally known as Paka Ariki.

Demographics
The Akaroa Harbour statistical area covers the settlements around the harbour with the exception of Akaroa.

Akaroa Harbour had a population of 729 at the 2018 New Zealand census, a decrease of 27 people (-3.6%) since the 2013 census, and an increase of 18 people (2.5%) since the 2006 census. There were 330 households. There were 363 males and 366 females, giving a sex ratio of 0.99 males per female. The median age was 57.9 years (compared with 37.4 years nationally), with 78 people (10.7%) aged under 15 years, 63 (8.6%) aged 15 to 29, 333 (45.7%) aged 30 to 64, and 255 (35.0%) aged 65 or older.

Ethnicities were 93.8% European/Pākehā, 6.6% Māori, 1.2% Pacific peoples, 2.5% Asian, and 2.5% other ethnicities (totals add to more than 100% since people could identify with multiple ethnicities).

The proportion of people born overseas was 21.0%, compared with 27.1% nationally.

Although some people objected to giving their religion, 49.4% had no religion, 39.9% were Christian, 0.8% were Buddhist and 2.5% had other religions.

Of those at least 15 years old, 159 (24.4%) people had a bachelor or higher degree, and 90 (13.8%) people had no formal qualifications. The median income was $28,100, compared with $31,800 nationally. The employment status of those at least 15 was that 279 (42.9%) people were employed full-time, 132 (20.3%) were part-time, and 3 (0.5%) were unemployed.

Geography and Natural Features 
The harbour is one of two eroded volcanic centres from the extinct Banks Peninsula Volcano.

The  Akaroa Marine Reserve was given approval in 2013 after a 17-year campaign to get it established.

, of the seven sites that are sampled in the harbour for water quality, six are graded as "good" and one as "fair" in terms of recreational use. Rainfall affects the grading.

Image gallery

See also
Coastline of New Zealand

References

External links

Akaroa and Akaroa Harbour at Te Ara: The Encyclopedia of New Zealand (published in  the 1966 An Encyclopaedia of New Zealand)
Akaroa Harbour Issues Working Party at Environment Canterbury
Save Akaroa Harbour (Akaroa Harbour Marine Protection Society)

Banks Peninsula
Geography of Canterbury, New Zealand
Ports and harbours of New Zealand
Calderas of New Zealand
Akaroa
Submarine calderas